Henrietta Goodman is an American poet, author of three poetry collections, most recently, All That Held Us (BkMk Press, 2018). Her first book, Take What You Want (Alice James Books, 2007), won the Beatrice Hawley Award.

Honors and awards
 2007 Beatrice Hawley Award, for Take What You Want
 Individual Artist Fellowship from the Montana Arts Council
 Fishtrap Fellowship
 residency at the Kimmel Harding Nelson Center for the Arts
 2001; 2002 Marjorie Davis Boyden Wilderness Writing Residency

Published works
Full-Length Poetry Collections
 All That Held Us (BkMk Press, 2018) 
 Hungry Moon (Mountain West Poetry Series, University Press of Colorado, 2013)
 

Criticism

References

External links
 Audio: Henrietta Goodman Reading for Fishousepoems.org
 Poem: poets.org > "Gretel" by Henrietta Goodman
 Interview: Kicking Wind > Every Other Day > 1 August 2007 > Henrietta Goodman Interview
 Poem: Guernica > April 2009 > Canada by Henrietta Goodman

Year of birth missing (living people)
Living people
University of Montana alumni
People from Gastonia, North Carolina
Poets from North Carolina
American women poets
Writers from Missoula, Montana
Poets from Montana
21st-century American women